The Forest of the Lost Souls is a 2017 Portuguese slasher drama film directed by José Pedro Lopes. Described as a "coming of age slasher movie", the film had its world premiere at the Director's Week of the Fantasporto Film Festival 2017.

The titular forest is a fictional place between Portugal and Spain, an infamous suicide spot. One morning two complete strangers with their own demons to bear meet within the woods.

Plot

Ricardo and Carolina are complete strangers that meet seemingly by chance in the "Forest of Lost Souls", a place where many people go to commit suicide. These two, a young woman and an old man, are no different from the others, as they came to the forest for this very reason. They decide to briefly postpone killing themselves in order to explore the forest and also to continue talking to one another, as Ricardo and Carolina find themselves intrigued by one another. However as they go further into the forest it becomes clear that one of the pair has other reasons for being in the forest and is not who they would have the other believe them to be and is actually a psycho killer.

Cast
 Daniela Love as Carolina
 Jorge Mota as Ricardo
 Mafalda Banquart as Filipa
 Ligia Roque as Joana
 Lília Lopes as Irene
 Tiago Jácome as Tiago

Reception 

On review aggregator Rotten Tomatoes, The Forest of the Lost Souls holds an approval rating of 75%, based on 16 reviews, and an average rating of 7/10. On Metacritic, the film has a weighted average score of 63 out of 100, based on 4 critics, indicating "Generally favorable reviews".

Screen Anarchy described the film as "Arthouse meets the Grindhouse".
Variety wrote "...the black-and-white stalker drama “The Forest of Lost Souls” is a nasty and impressive little thriller that goes about its business with ruthless cinematic efficiency."

The Los Angeles Times wrote "“The Forest of the Lost Souls” is a bit of a puzzle, which some viewers might find too much trouble to solve — especially given that in the middle it becomes shockingly violent. But the black-and-white images are lovely to look at, and whatever’s true or untrue about the characters, they’re all clearly alienated."

References

External links
 
 

2017 films
2017 horror films
Portuguese horror films
2010s Portuguese-language films
Films set in Portugal
Portuguese black-and-white films
2017 directorial debut films